Phymaturus calcogaster is a species of lizard in the family Liolaemidae. It is from Argentina.

References

calcogaster
Lizards of South America
Reptiles of Argentina
Endemic fauna of Argentina
Reptiles described in 2003
Taxa named by José Miguel Alfredo María Cei